Fortipesavis (meaning "strong-footed bird") is a genus of enantiornithine bird from the Late Cretaceous (Cenomanian) of Myanmar. The genus contains a single species, Fortipesavis prehendens, known from the holotype (YLSNHM01001), a mold of digits II–IV and a partial left tarsometatarsus preserved in amber.

References 

Enantiornitheans
Birds described in 2021
Fossil taxa described in 2021
Extinct birds of Asia
Prehistoric bird genera
Mesozoic birds of Asia